Michael Austin "Mic" Murphy (born January 9, 1958) is an American musician, lead singer of the successful 1980s synth R&B duo the System.  He is well known for singing the group's biggest hit, "Don't Disturb This Groove," a 1987 US #4 Pop and #1 R&B hit.

Career
Murphy was born in Raleigh, North Carolina, but he moved to Queens, New York at an early age.  As a young musician, he was an early advocate of MIDI music technology.  Murphy was road manager for the band Kleeer in the early 1980s, and through them he met his future System bandmate, David Frank. The two joined forces and made an immediate impact with their first album as the System.  The single "You Are in My System," helped to usher in a new era of electronically based pop music. Several years later, the group scored its major breakthrough with "Don't Disturb this Groove."

Solo career and beyond
After The System went on hiatus at the end of the 1980s, Murphy briefly pursued a solo career.  In 1991, he released his debut solo album, Touch, which featured a minor R&B hit, "Fit to Be Tied."  His 2004 remix with writing partner Tim K (of Lucy Woodward's "Blindsided"), reached #1 on the Billboard Club Play Chart.  He was a featured vocalist on Home & Garden's 2007 album Domesticated, which was released on Om Records and produced by Tim K and Timothy Shumaker.

Discography

Solo albums
Touch (1991)

with The System
 Sweat (1983)
 X-Periment (1984)
 The Pleasure Seekers (1985)
 Don't Disturb This Groove (1987)
 Rhythm & Romance (1989)
 ESP (2000)
 System Overload (2013)

References

External links
 Interview
 
 Soul Music
 Billboard bio; Billboard on-line
 MTV Biography; MTV on-line
 The System (David Frank) – 2012 Audio Interview Soul Interviews

The System (band)
Living people
Musicians from Raleigh, North Carolina
American contemporary R&B singers
1958 births
African-American guitarists
American rhythm and blues guitarists
American soul guitarists
American rhythm and blues singer-songwriters
American soul musicians
African-American songwriters
Singer-songwriters from North Carolina